Cielo was a United States supercomputer located at Los Alamos National Laboratory. Built by Cray Inc, the computer was part of the Advanced Simulation and Computing Program to maintain the United States nuclear stockpile.

From 31 March 2013, with the retirement of IBM Roadrunner, it took over as their front line computer. , it is ranked as number 32 on the TOP500. , it has been decommissioned and powered down permanently.

Notes

References
 New Cielo Supercomputer Arrives at Los Alamos

External links 
 Top500 ID card

Cray
Los Alamos National Laboratory
NNSA Advanced Technology Systems
One-of-a-kind computers
Petascale computers
X86 supercomputers